Oberpallen is a small town in the commune of Beckerich, in western Luxembourg. In 2005, the town had a population of 374.

Oberpallen was a commune in the canton of Redange until 25 July 1846, when it was merged into the commune of Beckerich.

Since fuel, tobacco, and alcohol taxes are lower in Luxembourg than in Belgium, many Belgians cross the border to get easy discounts there. In this respect, Oberpallen is like Steinfort and Martelange

Former commune
The former commune consisted of the villages:

 Dideling
 Levelange
 Oberpallen

Beckerich
Former communes of Luxembourg
Towns in Luxembourg